Chechen is a Northeast Caucasian language spoken by approximately 1.5 million people, mostly in the Chechen Republic and by members of the Chechen diaspora throughout Russia and the rest of Europe, Jordan, Austria, Turkey, Azerbaijan, Ukraine, Central Asia (mainly Kazakhstan and Kyrgyzstan) and Georgia.

Classification
Chechen is a Northeast Caucasian language. Together with the closely related Ingush, with which there exists a large degree of mutual intelligibility and shared vocabulary, it forms the Vainakh branch.

Dialects
There are a number of Chechen dialects: Ehki, Chantish, Chebarloish, Malkhish, Nokhchmakhkakhoish, Orstkhoish, Sharoish, Shuotoish, Terloish, Itum-Qalish and Himoish. The Kisti dialect of Georgia is not easily understood by northern Chechens without a few days' practice. One difference in pronunciation is that Kisti aspirated consonants remain aspirated when they are doubled (fortis) or after /s/, but they then lose their aspiration in other dialects.

Dialects of Chechen can be classified by their geographic position within the Chechen Republic. The dialects of the northern lowlands are often referred to as "" (literally "lowlander's language") and the dialect of the southern mountain tribes is known as "" (lit. "mountainer's language").  forms the basis for much of the standard and literary Chechen language, which can largely be traced to the regional dialects of Urus-Martan and contemporary Grozny. Laamaroy dialects include Chebarloish, Sharoish, Itum-Qalish, Kisti, and Himoish. Until recently, however, Himoy was undocumented and was considered a branch of Sharoish, as many dialects are also used as the basis of intertribal (teip) communication within a larger Chechen "". Laamaroy dialects such as Sharoish, Himoish and Chebarloish are more conservative and retain many features from Proto-Chechen. For instance, many of these dialects lack a number of vowels found in the standard language which were a result of long-distance assimilation between vowel sounds. Additionally, the Himoy dialect preserves word-final, post-tonic vowels as a schwa [ə], indicating Laamaroy and Ohwaroy dialects were already separate at the time that Oharoy dialects were undergoing assimilation.

Geographic distribution
According to the Russian Census of 2010, 1,350,000 people reported being able to speak Chechen in Russia.

Official status
Chechen is an official language of Chechnya.

Jordan

Chechens in Jordan have good relations with the Hashemite Kingdom of Jordan and are able to practice their own culture and language. Chechen language usage is strong among the Chechen community in Jordan. Jordanian Chechens are bilingual in both Chechen and Arabic, but do not speak Arabic among themselves, only speaking Chechen to other Chechens. Some Jordanians are literate in Chechen as well, having managed to read and write to people visiting Jordan from Chechnya.

Phonology
Some phonological characteristics of Chechen include its wealth of consonants and sounds similar to Arabic and the Salishan languages of North America, as well as a large vowel system resembling those of Swedish and German.

Consonants
The Chechen language has, like most indigenous languages of the Caucasus, a large number of consonants: about 40 to 60 (depending on the dialect and the analysis), far more than most European languages. Typical of the region, a four-way distinction between voiced, voiceless, ejective and geminate fortis stops is found. Furthermore, all variants except the ejective are subject to phonemic pharyngealization.

Nearly any consonant may be fortis because of focus gemination, but only the ones above are found in roots.
 is a back velar, but not quite uvular.
The lateral  may be velarized, unless it's followed by a front vowel. 
The trill  is usually articulated with a single contact, and therefore sometimes described as a tap .
Except in the literary register, and even then only for some speakers, the voiced affricates ,  have merged into the fricatives , . A voiceless labial fricative  is found only in European loanwords.
 appears both in diphthongs and as a consonant; as a consonant, it has an allophone  before front vowels.

Approximately twenty pharyngealized consonants (marked with superscript ) also appear in the table above. Labial, alveolar and postalveolar consonants may be pharyngealized, except for ejectives. Pharyngealized consonants do not occur in verbs or adjectives and in nouns and adverbs they occur predominantly before the low vowels .

Except when following a consonant,  is phonetically , and can be argued to be a glottal stop before a "pharyngealized" (actually epiglottalized) vowel. However, it does not have the distribution constraints characteristic of the anterior pharyngealized (epiglottalized) consonants. Although these may be analyzed as an anterior consonant plus  (they surface for example as [dʢ] when voiced and  when voiceless), Nichols argues that given the severe constraints against consonant clusters in Chechen, it is more useful to analyze them as single consonants.

The voiceless alveolar trill  contrasts with the voiced version , but only occurs in two roots,  "seven" and  "eight".

Vowels
Unlike most other languages of the Caucasus, Chechen has an extensive inventory of vowel sounds, about 44, putting its range higher than most languages of Europe (most vowels being the product of environmentally conditioned allophonic variation, which varies by both dialect and method of analysis). Many of the vowels are due to umlaut, which is highly productive in the standard dialect. None of the spelling systems used so far have distinguished the vowels with complete accuracy.

All vowels may be nasalized. Nasalization is imposed by the genitive, infinitive, and for some speakers the nominative case of adjectives. Nasalization is not strong, but it is audible even in final vowels, which are devoiced.

Some of the diphthongs have significant allophony:  = ;  = ;  = .

Pharyngealization appears to be a feature of the consonants, though some analyses treat it as a feature of the vowels. Vowels have a delayed murmured onset after pharyngealized voiced consonants and a noisy aspirated onset after pharyngealized voiceless consonants. The high vowels  are diphthongized, whereas the diphthongs  undergo metathesis, .

Phonotactics
Chechen permits syllable-initial clusters  and non-initially also allows  plus any consonant, and any obstruent plus a uvular of the same manner of articulation.

Grammar
Chechen is an agglutinative language with an ergative–absolutive morphosyntactic alignment. Chechen nouns belong to one of several genders or classes (6), each with a specific prefix with which the verb or an accompanying adjective agrees. The verb does not agree with person or number, having only tense forms and participles. Among these are an optative and an antipassive. Some verbs, however, do not take these prefixes.

Chechen is an ergative, dependent-marking language using eight cases (absolutive, genitive, dative, ergative, allative, instrumental, locative and comparative) and a large number of postpositions to indicate the role of nouns in sentences.

Word order is consistently left-branching (like in Japanese or Turkish), so that adjectives, demonstratives and relative clauses precede the nouns they modify. Complementizers and adverbial subordinators, as in other Northeast and in Northwest Caucasian languages, are affixes rather than independent words.

Chechen also presents interesting challenges for lexicography, as creating new words in the language relies on fixation of whole phrases rather than adding to the end of existing words or combining existing words. It can be difficult to decide which phrases belong in the dictionary, because the language's grammar does not permit the borrowing of new verbal morphemes to express new concepts. Instead, the verb dan (to do) is combined with nominal phrases to correspond with new concepts imported from other languages.

Noun classes
Chechen nouns are divided into six lexically arbitrary noun classes. Morphologically, noun classes may be indexed by changes in the prefix of the accompanying verb and, in many cases, the adjective too. The first two of these classes apply to human beings, although some grammarians count these as two and some as a single class; the other classes however are much more lexically arbitrary. Chechen noun classes are named according to the prefix that indexes them:

When a noun denotes a human being, it usually falls into v- or y-Classes (1 or 2). Most nouns referring to male entities fall into the v-class, whereas Class 2 contains words related to female entities. Thus lūlaxuo (a neighbour) is class 1, but takes v- if a male neighbour and y- if a female. In a few words, changing the prefixes before the nouns indicates grammatical gender; thus: vоsha (brother) → yisha (sister). Some nouns denoting human beings, however, are not in Classes 1 or 2: bēr (child) for example is in class 3.

Classed adjectives
Only a few of Chechen's adjectives index noun class agreement, termed classed adjectives in the literature. Classed adjectives are listed with the -d class prefix in the romanizations below:
 деза/d-eza ‘heavy’ 
 довха/d-ouxa ‘hot’ 
 деха/d-iexa ‘long’ 
 дуькъа/d-yq’a ‘thick’ 
 дораха/d-oraxa ‘cheap’ 
 дерстана/d-erstana ‘fat’ 
 дуьткъа/d-ytq’a thin’ 
 доца/d-oca ‘short’ 
 дайн/d-ain ‘light’ 
 дуьзна/d-yzna ‘full’ 
 даьржана/d-aerzhana ‘spread’ 
 доккха/d-oqqa ‘large/big/old’

Declension
Whereas Indo-European languages code noun class and case conflated in the same morphemes, Chechen nouns show no gender marking but decline in eight grammatical cases, four of which are core cases (i.e. absolutive, ergative, genitive, and dative) in singular and plural. Below the paradigm for "говр" (horse).

Pronouns

The locative has still a few further forms for specific positions.

Verbs
Verbs do not inflect for person (except for the special d- prefix for the 1st and 2nd persons plural), only for number and tense, aspect, mood. A minority of verbs exhibit agreement prefixes, and these agree with the noun in the absolutive case (what in English translation would the subject, for intransitive verbs, or the object, with transitive verbs).

Example of verbal agreement in intransitive clause with a composite verb:
Со цхьан сахьтехь вогІур ву (so tsHan saHteH ) = I (male) will come in one hour
Со цхьан сахьтехь йогІур ю (so tsHan saHteH ) = I (female) will come in one hour
Here, both the verb's future stem -oghur (will come) and the auxiliary -u (present tense of 'be') receive the prefix v- for masculine agreement and y- for feminine agreement.

In transitive clauses in compound continuous tenses formed with the auxiliary verb -u 'to be', both agent and object are in absolutive case. In this special case of a biabsolutive construction, the main verb in participial form agrees with the object, while the auxiliary agrees with the agent.
Cо бепиг деш ву (so bepig diesh vu) = I (male) am making bread.
Here, the participle d-iesh agree with the object, whereas the auxiliary v-u agrees with the agent.

Verbal tenses are formed by ablaut or suffixes, or both (there are five conjugations in total, below is one). Derived stems can be formed by suffixation as well (causative, etc.):

Alphabets

Numerous inscriptions in the Georgian script are found in mountainous Chechnya, but they are not necessarily in Chechen. Later, the Arabic script was introduced for Chechen, along with Islam. The Chechen Arabic alphabet was first reformed during the reign of Imam Shamil, and then again in 1910, 1920 and 1922.

At the same time, the alphabet devised by Peter von Uslar, consisting of Cyrillic, Latin, and Georgian letters, was used for academic purposes. In 1911 it too was reformed but never gained popularity among the Chechens themselves.

1925 Latin alphabet
The Latin alphabet was introduced in 1925. It was unified with Ingush in 1934, but abolished in 1938.

Cyrillic alphabet
From 1938 to 1992, only the Cyrillic script was used for Chechen.

1992 Latin alphabet
In 1992, a new Latin Chechen alphabet was introduced, but after the defeat of the secessionist government, the Cyrillic alphabet was restored.

Comparison chart

The single letters and digraphs that count as separate letters of the alphabet, along with their correspondences, are as follows. Those in parentheses are optional or only found in Russian words:

In addition, several sequences of letters for long vowels and consonants, while not counted as separate letters in their own right, are presented here to clarify their correspondences:

Notes

Vocabulary
Most Chechen vocabulary is derived from the Nakh branch of the Northeast Caucasian language family, although there are significant minorities of words derived from Arabic (Islamic terms, like "Iman", "Ilma", "Do'a") and a smaller amount from Turkic (like "kuzga", "shish", belonging to the universal Caucasian stratum of borrowings) and most recently Russian (modern terms, like computer – "kamputar", television – "telvideni", televisor – "telvizar", metro – "metro" etc.).

History
Before the Russian conquest, most writings in Chechnya consisted of Islamic texts and clan histories, written usually in Arabic but sometimes also in Chechen using Arabic script. The Chechen literary language was created after the October Revolution, and the Latin script began to be used instead of Arabic for Chechen writing in the mid-1920s. The Cyrillic script was adopted in 1938. Almost the entire library of Chechen medieval writing in Arabic and Georgian script about the land of Chechnya and its people was destroyed by Soviet authorities in 1944, leaving the modern Chechens and modern historians with a destroyed and no longer existent historical treasury of writings.

The Chechen diaspora in Jordan, Turkey, and Syria is fluent but generally not literate in Chechen except for individuals who have made efforts to learn the writing system. The Cyrillic alphabet is not generally known in these countries, and thus most use the Latin alphabet.

References

Sources

External links

Appendix:Cyrillic script
The Cyrillic and Latin Chechen alphabets
The Chechen language | Noxchiin mott Wealth of linguistic information. (No longer active, some information is retained)
Rferl North Caucasus Radio (also includes Avar and Adyghe)
Russian–Chechen on-line dictionary
Chechen-Russian dictionary
Chechen basic lexicon at the Global Lexicostatistical Database
Chechen Cyrillic - Latin converter
ELAR archive of Chechen including the Cheberloi dialect
Chechen Text Corpus

 
Northeast Caucasian languages
Agglutinative languages
Languages of Russia
Languages of Iraq
Languages of Jordan
Languages written in Cyrillic script